Holy Innocents' Episcopal School (HIES) is a PK–12 private, Episcopal, co-educational college-preparatory day school in Sandy Springs, Georgia, United States. It is located in the Episcopal Diocese of Atlanta.

It is the largest Episcopal parish day school in the United States and the only PK-12-grade Episcopal school in Georgia. In recent years, the school has undergone expansion: constructing a new 65,000 sq. foot STEM building, adding a new middle school building, doubling the size of the gymnasium and athlete-training complex, and adding two on-campus football/soccer/lacrosse fields.

Academics 
Recent academic initiatives include the Laptop Program. Fifth- through twelfth-grade students are leased Apple MacBook Airs by the school, which are programmed with a range of productivity, research, and multimedia software central to their classes. The laptops are replaced prior to the start of a student's ninth-grade year. The Upper School's Program for Global Citizenship includes Comparative Religion, World Literature, Environmental Science, increased foreign language requirements, foreign study, and international service projects. Holy Innocents’ also offers more AP courses than any other school in Atlanta.

Athletics 
The athletics at the school are known as the Golden Bears and play at the GHSA Class A Private Region 5 division level.

Notable alumni 
 Brian Baumgartner, actor
 Skye Bolt, Major League Baseball player
 Owen Vaccaro, child actor

References

External links 
 

Episcopal schools in the United States
Private K-12 schools in Sandy Springs, Georgia
Preparatory schools in Georgia (U.S. state)
Christian schools in Georgia (U.S. state)